Criuleni is a district in the central part of Moldova, with the administrative center at Criuleni.
As of January 1, 2011, its population was 73,100.

Toponimics
The history of love of two young Criu and Lenuța - from neighboring towns, and whose parents forbade them to marry, had a tragic end. Finding no other solution, they were thrown into the river Nistru. In there came two young parents and relatives, and he wept, understanding the tragedy they have committed. Some time passed parents and relatives living on the Nistru river, wanting to be closer to loved ones and the city have called Crio-Lean. Over several years the name was changed in Criuleni.

History
The first human settlements occurred in the administrative area today, still millennium III-II BC. In the fourteenth century, the region was ruled today by the Golden Horde, but by the end of the century after heavy fighting, horde is forced to leave the territory ruled. In 1393 Prince of Moldavia Roman I is named "Prince of Moldavia, from the Carpathians to the sea (Black Sea)" The villages in the district with the oldest documentary attestation are Bălășești, Jevreni, Mascauti and Riscova, historically documented localities for the first time 1435–1436. 16th-18th centuries, the region is developing as peripherals of Principality of Moldova, but all is an important custom on the Nistru, the culture (to build the church), so there has been a significant increase in population. In 1812, after the Russo-Turkish War (1806-1812), is the occupation of Basarabia, Russian Empire during this period (1812–1917), there is an intense russification of the native population. In 1918 after the collapse of the Russian Empire, Bessarabia united with Romania in this period (1918–1940, 1941–1944), the district is part of the Chișinău County. In 1940 after Molotov-Ribbentrop Treaty, Basarabia is occupied by the USSR. In 1991 as a result of the proclamation of Independence of Moldova, part and residence of the Chisinau County (1991–2003), and in 2003 became administrative unit of Moldova.

Geography
Criuleni District is located in the central part of Moldova. Does the neighborhood: in the north Orhei District, Dubăsari District in the east, south Anenii Noi District, in western Municipality of Chișinău, and Strășeni District. District is located within the eastern extremity of Central Moldavian Plateau, and northern part of Lower Nistru Plains. The landscape is characterized by intercalation of deep valleys and wide. On steep slopes erosion occurs, and landslides. Horizontal dismantling of relief averaged 1.0-1.5 km / km2. Vertical dismemberment of the territory makes up an average of 120–130 m. The northern part of Lower Nistru Plain is characterized by absolute altitudes of 100–200 m by the presence of a flat and low relief fragmented. In some places, meet some narrow valleys, not too deep, valleys, whose depth does not exceed 20–30 m. Erosion occurs weak. Ravines have a limited spread, but the flat slope erosion processes are developed. District has deposits minerals: limestone, sand, gravel and clay. In the district are 10 mines acquisition of limestone blocks, and 7 operating sand quarries gravel and crushed stone. In places where limestone rocks appear on the surface karst processes develop. Absolute altitude between 265 m swing territory, and 40 m in the meadow Raut

Climate
The district is included in the temperate climate-continental, characterized by frequent and winters large variety of air temperature, with little snow, summers long, hot and not too large amounts of precipitation falling as rain in general . Total solar radiation varies between 112-114 kcal/square cm per year. The average air temperature in the region is +9.6 degrees Celsius. The average temperature of the coldest month (January) is -3.6 degrees Celsius and the warmest months (July) is +22 degrees. Absolute maximum temperature is +35.7 degrees Celsius and the absolute minimum temperature is -20.9.

Fauna
Typical European fauna characterized by: fox, hedgehog, badger, deer, wild boar, raccoon dog, less red deer, wildcat and wolf. From birds: stork, swan, hawk, starlings, gulls and others.

Flora
Forests occupy 12.0% of district area and are characterized by oak, English oak, maple, locust, linden, and more. Plants: fescue, mugwort, burdock, clover, nettle and others.

Rivers
District is located in the Nistru river basin, which crosses the district in the west, the main tributaries that cross the district are: Răut River (286 km) and Bîc River (155 km). There are 62 fountains, fountains mine 5060 and 23 springs.

Administrative subdivisions

Localities: 43
Administrative center: Criuleni
Cities: Criuleni
Villages: 18
Bălășești
Bălțata de Sus
Chetroasa
Ciopleni
Hîrtopul Mic
Logănești
Mărdăreuca
Mălăiești
Mălăieștii Noi
Ohrincea
Porumbeni
Ratuș
Sagaidac
Sagaidacul de Sus
Stețcani
Valea Coloniței
Valea Satului
Zolonceni
Communes: 24
Bălăbănești
Bălțata
Boșcana
Cimișeni
Corjova
Coșernița
Cruglic
Dolinnoe
Drăsliceni
Dubăsarii Vechi
Hîrtopul Mare
Hrușova
Ișnovăț
Izbiște
Jevreni
Mașcăuți
Măgdăcești
Miclești
Onițcani
Pașcani
Răculești
Rîșcova
Slobozia-Dușca
Zăicana

Demographics
1 January 2012 the district population was 73,300 of which 11.3% urban and 88.7% rural population

Births (2010): 1033 (14.1 per 1000)
Deaths (2010): 923 (12.6 per 1000)
Growth rate (2010): 110 (1.5 per 1000)

Ethnic groups 

Footnote: * There is an ongoing controversy regarding the ethnic identification of Moldovans and Romanians.

Religion 

Christians - 98.6%
Orthodox Christians - 98.0%
Protestant - 0.6%
Baptists - 0.5%
Seventh-day Adventists - 0.1%
Other - 1.0%
No Religion 0.4%

Economy
District budget for 2007 the income was stated in the amount of 97,930,900. lei and amounted to 101,291,300 executed lei which also represents 103.4% and annual expenses specified amount constitutes 107,768,700 lei was performed in a volume of 102,999,300 lei at a rate of 95.6%. Were not allowed to pay debts. District budget for 2008 was set at income and expenses amounted to 87.4 mln. lei, with no deficit.

Agriculture
43,490 ha (63.2%) agricultural land, including 36,510 ha (53.0%) of arable land, orchards 2,511 ha (3.6%), 2,440 ha (3.5%) vineyards, walnut groves of 458,0 ha (0.7%), 5,390 ha (7.8%) grassland, 536,0 ha (0.8%) land for road transport, land destined fund 8,308 ha (12.0%) reserve.

Culture
Network of cultural institutions include: 27 houses of culture and cultural centers, 30 libraries, three museums, four art schools. Cultural potential of the district is expressed by the honorary title of artistic collectives Model.

Politics
Criuleni district, both political and electoral support of right-wing parties in Moldova represented by the AEI. PCRM is in a continuous fall in the last three elections.

During the last three elections AEI had an increase of 58.3%

Elections

|-
!style="background-color:#E9E9E9" align=center colspan="2" valign=center|Parties and coalitions
!style="background-color:#E9E9E9" align=right|Votes
!style="background-color:#E9E9E9" align=right|%
!style="background-color:#E9E9E9" align=right|+/−
|-
| 
|align=left|Party of Communists of the Republic of Moldova
|align="right"|12,333
|align="right"|33.37
|align="right"|−0.86
|-
| 
|align=left|Liberal Democratic Party of Moldova
|align="right"|12,163
|align="right"|33.31
|align="right"|+16.46
|-
| 
|align=left|Democratic Party of Moldova
|align="right"|4,118
|align="right"|11,28
|align="right"|-2.01
|-
| 
|align=left|Liberal Party
|align="right"|4,032
|align="right"|11.04
|align="right"|−9.07
|-
| 
|align=left|Party Alliance Our Moldova
|align="right"|1,058
|align="right"|2.90
|align="right"|−8.28
|-
|bgcolor=#0033cc|
|align=left|European Action Movement
|align="right"|1,002
|align="right"|2.74
|align="right"|+2.74
|-
|bgcolor="grey"|
|align=left|Other Party
|align="right"|1,824
|align="right"|4.96
|align="right"|+0.62
|-
|align=left style="background-color:#E9E9E9" colspan="2"|Total (turnout 62.75%)
|width="30" align="right" style="background-color:#E9E9E9"|36,792
|width="30" align="right" style="background-color:#E9E9E9"|100.00
|width="30" align="right" style="background-color:#E9E9E9"|

Education

The district operates two sports schools, a school of leisure, 2 boarding schools, 29 kindergartens, with a contingent of 2098 children, 2 primary schools, 13 secondary schools, 9 secondary schools of general education, 10 schools with a contingent of 10 305 students.

Health
In the territory there are 12 health centers, 17 Family doctor's offices, public health institution (District Hospital Criuleni)

References

 District site
 Talk:Criuleni district
 District population per year
 Result of 2010 Parliamentary Election in Criuleni district

 
Districts of Moldova